Little Krishna is an Indian 3D animated epic television series created by Reliance Entertainment in 2009. It was originally aired on Nickelodeon and later aired on Discovery Kids and Sun TV.

The series is based on the legend of Hindu deity Krishna. It has 13 standalone episodes involving Krishna between the ages of five and nine.

Production 
Ashish SK CEO of BIG Animation mentioned the series, which has over 300 characters and as many locations, has taken over seven years in the making, and involved an investment of 50 crore rupees.

The series is scripted by Jeffery Scott.

Big Animation made Little Krishna in two formats — 13 standalone episodes of approximately 22 minutes each and three feature films of 66 minutes each. The 13-part series was broadcast on Nick in India.

Release 
Little Krishna was first aired on Nickelodeon for south Asian territory in May 2009. The series received a nation-wide recognition.

Evergreen Entertainment is distributor for the series. Their CEO Steve Walsh commented:

. Details on each character, team and episodes are available at Little Krishna web page.

See also 
 List of Indian animated television series
 List of Indian animated films

References 

2009 Indian television series debuts
Indian animated short films
Indian animated television series
Krishna in popular culture
Indian television series about Hindu deities